Baku was a Kiev-class aircraft carrier  of the Soviet Navy and the Russian Navy from  1987 to 1996. In 1991 the ship was renamed Admiral Flota Sovetskogo Soyuza Gorshkov ( "Admiral of the Fleet of the Soviet Union Gorshkov") in Russian service.

Sometimes Baku is considered a separate class due to her improvements including a phased array radar, extensive electronic warfare installations, and an enlarged command and control suite. She was launched in 1982, and was in service from 1987 to 1991 in the Soviet Navy as Baku, and from 1991 to 1996 in the Russian Navy as Admiral Gorshkov.

In 2004, Gorshkov was sold to India with extensive conversion and entered service as the new aircraft carrier .

History

The ship was laid down in 1978 at Nikolayev South (Shipyard No.444) in Ukraine, launched in 1982, and commissioned in December 1987. The delay in commissioning was largely caused by software bugs in the new command and control system. The ship was renamed Admiral Gorshkov after the collapse of the Soviet Union in 1991, as the city of Baku was now in independent Azerbaijan. Sergey Gorshkov was responsible for the expansion of the Soviet Navy during the Cold War.

In 1994, following a boiler room explosion, the ship was docked for a year of repairs. Although she returned to service in 1995, she was finally withdrawn in 1996 and offered for sale.

On 20 January 2004, Russia agreed to sell Admiral Gorshkov to India after an extensive upgrade at Sevmash Enterprise. In December 2009, it was reported that India had agreed to pay a price of US$2.3 billion. The carrier, now named INS Vikramaditya, was commissioned into the Indian Navy on 16 November 2013.

Design

The fourth of the Project 1143 aircraft carrying cruisers, Baku had many differences from the rest of the class, trialing technologies to be used on the Admiral Kuznetsov. The most obvious is the massive passive electronically scanned array above the bridge. This was the phased array antenna for the Mars-Passat ("Sky Watch") 3D air search radar. Sky Watch proved troublesome and was probably never operational.

The biggest change to the weapon systems was the replacement of the 4K60 (SA-N-3 'Goblet') and 9K33 Osa (SA-N-4 'Gecko') SAM launchers with four SA-N-9 'Gauntlet' VLS launchers. This allowed room for another two 4K80 (SS-N-12 'Sandbox') launchers. The two AA guns of the Kievs were replaced with 100 mm guns, and the SUW-N-1 launcher was removed.

The air wing was the same as the other Kievs, consisting of a squadron of twelve Yakovlev Yak-38 ('Forger') V/STOL strike fighter aircraft (until they were retired in 1992), twelve Kamov Ka-27 ('Helix-A') ASW/SAR helicopters and two Ka-31 ('Helix') airborne early warning helicopters. Flight operations were assisted by the distinctive new "Cake Stand" tactical air navigation system.

Baku was used for trials of the Yak-141 Freestyle supersonic VTOL fighter.

Notes

References

External links

 Проект ТАКР 1143.4 -  БАКУ - АДМИРАЛ ГОРШКОВ Архивн.- Подробное описание проекта.
 Project 1143 Krechyet, Kiev class; Global Security
 Delay in Naval Projects; Press Information Bureau, India
 Admiral Gorshkov; Maritimequest.com

Kiev-class aircraft carriers
Ships built at the Black Sea Shipyard
1982 ships
Cold War aircraft carriers of the Soviet Union
Ships of the Russian Northern Fleet
Ships built in the Soviet Union